The Tribal News Network, known on air as TNN,  is a radio and internet news agency based in Peshawar, the capital of the Khyber Pakhtunkhwa province of Pakistan.

TNN produces radio bulletins in the Pashto language, about news, current affairs and social issues. These bulletins are broadcast on ten partner radio stations  throughout Khyber Pakhtunkhwa, the Federally Administered Tribal Areas (FATA), Balochistan and into the border regions of Afghanistan. News is also reported in Urdu and in English on TNN’s website. In August 2016, TNN also began broadcasting 2 minute news bulletins via mobile phone.

TNN produces two main news bulletins each day and employs 35 local journalists including 6 women. It has correspondents reporting from all districts of Khyber Pakhtunkhwa and FATA.

History 
TNN’s first bulletin went to air  on November 9, 2013. TNN is officially registered under the Companies Ordinance, 1984 with the Security Exchange Commission of Pakistan. In 2015, TNN was runner-up in the special award category of the One World Media Awards.  In 2015, TNN was recognised by the Geuzenpennning Foundation  as a tribute to individuals or institutions that have “devoted themselves to fighting for democracy or against dictatorship, discrimination and racism.”

Availability 
TNN's bulletins are broadcast on:
 Radio Tehzeeb – FM 91.6 in Khyber Agency
 Radio Dilber –  FM 93 in Charsadda district
 Radio Dilber –  FM 94 in Swabi district
 Radio Lakki – FM 88 in Lakki Marwat district
 Radio Global – FM 91 in Dera Ismail Khan district
 [Radio Chiltan] – FM 88 in Quetta
 Radio Voice of Time – FM 105.6 Hassan Abdal district
 Radio  Shamal – FM 98.6 Bajaur Agency
 Radio Tawheed – FM 89.3 Kunar province, Afghanistan
 Radio Speenghar – FM 89.4 Nangarhar Afghanistan

See also 
 Al Jazeera Documentary 
 TERP University of Maryland 
 Free Press Unlimited
 Dawn TV
 Christian Science Monitor 
 LA Times

References 

Radio stations in Pakistan
2013 establishments in Pakistan
Mass media in Peshawar